The canton of Brénod is an administrative division in eastern France. It was disbanded following the French canton reorganisation which came into effect in March 2015. It consisted of 12 communes, which joined the canton of Plateau d'Hauteville in 2015. It had 3,746 inhabitants (2012).

The canton comprised 12 communes:

Brénod
Champdor
Chevillard
Condamine
Corcelles
Le Grand-Abergement
Hotonnes
Izenave
Lantenay
Outriaz
Le Petit-Abergement
Vieu-d'Izenave

Demographics

References

See also
Cantons of the Ain department 
Communes of France

Former cantons of Ain
2015 disestablishments in France
States and territories disestablished in 2015